Kurówko may refer to the following places:
Kurówko, Przasnysz County in Masovian Voivodeship (east-central Poland)
Kurówko, Sierpc County in Masovian Voivodeship (east-central Poland)
Kurówko, West Pomeranian Voivodeship (north-west Poland)